Arturo Arias may refer to:
 Arturo Arias (writer) (born 1950), Guatemalan novelist
 Arturo Arias (engineer) (1923–2001), Chilean engineer